The Ministry of Demographics, Family, Youth and Social Policy of the Republic of Croatia is the ministry in the Government of Croatia which performs administrative and professional tasks related to the social welfare institutions, the care and protection of people and families, youth, persons with disabilities, victims of trafficking, refugees, asylum seekers and professional activities related to foster care and adoption.

List of ministers

Ministers of Labour and Social Welfare (1990–2003)

From 23 December 2003 to 23 December 2011 the Ministry of Labour and Social Welfare was split and divided between two ministries. The social welfare portfolio was merged with Ministry of Health and labour portfolio was merged with Ministry of Economy.

After 23 December 2011 there are two ministries, one for Labour and one for Social Policies.

Ministers of Social Politics and Youth (2011–2016)

Ministry of Demographics, Family, Youth and Social Politicy (2016–)

Notes
 nb 1.  Served as Minister of Labour, Veteran and Disability Issues
nb 2.  Served as Minister of Labour, Social Welfare and Family
nb 3.  Served as Minister of Labour and Social Welfare

References

External links 
 

Social Welfare Policy and Youth
Ministries established in 1990
1990 establishments in Croatia
Children, young people and families ministries
Social affairs ministries